Randy Pippin is an American football coach. He grew up in Texas and attended Cisco College before transferring to Tennessee Technological University where he played running back from 1983 to 1984. He began his coaching career in 1985 as a graduate assistant at Tennessee Tech, and then held assistant positions at Middle Tennessee (1988–1989), Trinity Valley Community College (1990–1992) and again at Tennessee Tech (1996–1997). Pippin has also served as head coach at Trinity Valley Community College (1993–1995), Middle Georgia College (1998–2000), West Alabama (2001–2003), Cottage Hill Christian Academy in Mobile Alabama (2004), Northwest Mississippi Community College (2005–2007), The Classical Academy in Colorado Springs, Colorado(2009–2010) while directing the Glazier Mega Clinics.  He then returned to Texas as the Defensive Coordinator at East Texas Baptist and later East Central Oklahoma while directing the Texas and Oklahoma Nike Coach of the Year Clinics.  In recent years Pippin worked both on and off the field from 2015-2022 as an assistant at UAB until 2023 when he became a Senior Analyst for Rich Rodriguez at Jacksonville State University (Alabama).

Coaching career
Pippin started his coaching career as a graduate assistant on the defense at Tennessee Technological University from 1985 to 1987. From Tech, Pippin served as linebackers coach at Murfreesboro (1988–1989) and as defensive coordinator at Trinity Valley Community College (1990–1992).

From 1993 to 1995, Pippin had his first head coaching job at Trinity Valley after being promoted from defensive coordinator. At Trinity Valley Randy was the NJCAA National Coach of the Year in 94, he compiled an overall record of 26 wins, six losses and two ties (26–6–2). He also led the Cardinals to the 1994 NJCAA National Football Championship after defeating Northeastern Oklahoma A&M College in the Tyler Shrine Bowl. After serving as offensive coordinator at Tennessee Tech for two seasons, Pippin took the position of head coach and athletic director at Middle Georgia College.

At Middle Georgia, he led the Warriors to an overall record of 26 wins and eight losses (26–8) and a victory in the 1998 Mineral Water Bowl. Pippin was also noted for having Tonya Butler sign a national letter of intent to attend Middle Georgia on a football scholarship for a placekicker. At the time of her signing, Butler was the first female to earn a football scholarship in Georgia. Following the 2000 season, Pippin resigned from Middle Georgia and took the head coaching position at the University of West Alabama.

At West Alabama, he led the previously bottom dwelling Tigers to an overall record of eight wins and 25 losses (8–25) during his three-year tenure but won 5 games in his 2nd season including victories over Delta State, West Georgia and North Alabama in the same season which had never happened. One notable event of his tenure at West Alabama came on September 13, 2003, when Tonya Butler (who he previously signed at Middle Georgia) became the first female in NCAA history to kick a field goal in a regulation game. The goal was scored on a 27-yard attempt against Stillman with 9:41 remaining in the first quarter.

After leaving West Alabama, Pippin spent a year as a Dean and Athletic Director/HFC at Cottage Hill Christian Academy in Mobile Alabama then became the head coach at Northwest Mississippi Community College. During his three-year stint with the Rangers, his teams participated in post season championship games his 2nd and 3rd years. His 2nd year team won the North Division with a perfect 6-0 record.  From there he served as head coach at The Classical Academy in Colorado Springs, Colorado while directing the Glazier Football Coaching Clinics nationally.  He then became the defensive coordinator at East Texas Baptist University for the 2011 and 2012 seasons while taking on the Texas and Oklahoma Nike Coach of the Year Clinics. He then moved to East Central University to serve as defensive coordinator.  While at East Central he orchestrated the best rushing defense in school history and East Central participated in a post season bowl game marking the schools first post season in more than 20 years. Coach Pippin then joined coach Bill Clark at UAB serving in various on and off field coaching, recruiting, retention and administrative roles as the program was brought back from a shutdown after the 2014 season. Pippin has authored 2 internationally published and distributed books "C.H.A.O.S." which is a defensive instructional manual and "Deep in the Heart" https://www.amazon.com/Deep-Heart-Randy-Pippin-ebook/dp/B084D96H5Q which is a faith based coaches daily devotion book based on southern football history and the UAB Football death, burial, resurrection, return and future.

Head coaching record

Junior college

References

External links
 UAB profile

1963 births
Living people
American football running backs
Cisco Wranglers football players
East Texas Baptist Tigers football coaches
East Central Tigers football coaches
Middle Tennessee Blue Raiders football coaches
Tennessee Tech Golden Eagles football coaches
Tennessee Tech Golden Eagles football players
Trinity Valley Cardinals football coaches
West Alabama Tigers football coaches
High school football coaches in Colorado
Junior college football coaches in the United States